The 2013–14 Illinois Piasa season was the eighth season of the Illinois Piasa professional indoor soccer club and fourth as a franchise in the Professional Arena Soccer League. The Piasa, named for the Piasa Bird of Native American legend, are an Eastern Division team who played their home games at The Field Sports Complex in Pontoon Beach, Illinois.

The team was led by general manager Matt Williams and interim head coach Ed Rulo. The Pizazz Dance Team was led by Danielle Lusicic-Wise. Former player Doug Montroy led the team as head coach for the first 10 games of the season before being dismissed "with the best interests of both parties in mind". Ed Rulo served out the season as interim coach,

Season summary
The Piasa season started strong under rookie head coach Doug Montroy with a home win over the expansion Tulsa Revolution but the team lost its next 9 games. Many of the losses were by 1 or 2 goals but the January 4 loss to the Cleveland Freeze by a score of 27–6 set several league records and Cleveland fell one short of the PASL record of 28 goals by one team in a game. Roster instability, lack of practice time, and reduced payroll were among the reasons cited by the coach for the team's struggles on and off the field. Montroy was replaced as head coach by his assistant, Ed Rulo, beginning with the January 11 game against the Chicago Mustangs. The team averaged just 299 fans per home game, the 18th-best draw in the 20-team league.

The Illinois Piasa participated in the 2013–14 United States Open Cup for Arena Soccer, losing their Round of 32 game against the independent Chicago-based A.A.C. Eagles on Saturday, December 14, 2013, by a score of 7–4.

Schedule

Regular season

♥ Postponed from January 5 due to extreme winter weather then postponed again from January 26 due to a scheduling conflict

U.S. Open Cup for Arena Soccer

References

External links
Illinois Piasa official website
The Field Sports Complex official website

Illinois Piasa seasons
Illinois Piasa
Illinois Piasa 2013
Illinois Piasa 2013